The Carnahan House is a historic house at 1200 South Laurel Street in Pine Bluff, Arkansas.  Built in 1919, it is a high-quality example of Craftsman and Tudor Revival styling, designed by Mitchell Seligman, a prolific local architect.  It is a -story brick structure, with a side gable roof and a front-facing cross gable with half-timber stucco.  The property includes a garage and guesthouse, also designed by Seligman.

The house was listed on the National Register of Historic Places in 2014.

See also
National Register of Historic Places listings in Jefferson County, Arkansas

References

Houses completed in 1919
Houses in Pine Bluff, Arkansas
Houses on the National Register of Historic Places in Arkansas
National Register of Historic Places in Pine Bluff, Arkansas
Tudor Revival architecture in the United States